Plato Township is one of sixteen townships in Kane County, Illinois, USA. As of the 2010 census, its population was 6,166 and it contained 2,182 housing units. It was originally named Homer Township; the name was changed to Plato on July 2, 1850.

Geography

Cities, towns, villages
 Campton Hills (partial)
 Elgin (partial)
 Pingree Grove (partial)

Unincorporated towns
 Bowes at 
 Bowes Bend at 
 Chippewa at 
 Hidden Lakes at 
 McQueen at 
 North Plato at 
 Plato Center at 
 Plato Corners at 
 Silent Meadow at 
 Tamara Heights at 
(This list is based on USGS data and may include former settlements.)

Airports and landing strips
 Olson Airport

Cemeteries
The township contains these five cemeteries: Plato Center, L R Baker, North Plato, Udina and Washington Memorial.

Major highways
 U.S. Route 20
 Illinois Route 47

Demographics

School districts
 Central Community Unit School District 301
 Community Unit School District 300
 School District U-46
 St. Charles Community Unit School District 303

Political districts
 Illinois's 14th congressional district
 State House District 49
 State Senate District 25

References
 
 United States Census Bureau 2009 TIGER/Line Shapefiles
 United States National Atlas

External links
 City-Data.com
 Illinois State Archives
 Township Officials of Illinois

Townships in Kane County, Illinois
Townships in Illinois
1849 establishments in Illinois